The Suehiro-za (末広座) was a kabuki theatre in Nagoya, central Japan. It was located in Suehiro-chō.

History 
In Nagoya of the Meiji era at that time a number of theatres existed, such as the Chitose-za (千歳座) in Minamikuwana-machi (南桑名町), Shinmori-za (新守座) in Motoshige-chō (本重町), Onu-za (音羽座) in Minamifushimi-chō (南伏見町), Hoso-za (宝生座) in Ōsu, and Misono-za. The theatre was founded under a different name originally in January 1883.

Among the many noted actors were Nakamura Denkurō VI (1859-1923), who was born in Suehiro-chō and became of a member of the children actors troupe at the Suehiro-za. Ichikawa Chūsha VII (1860-1936) and Ichikawa Danzō VII (1836-1911) appeared together in May 1909, as well as Nakamura Tokizō III (1895-1959) appeared here in May 1917.

The building was bought by Shochiku, a cinema chain which has its roots in kabuki production, and converted into a movie theatre in 1927. Under its new name Shochiku-za (松竹座) it became one of the leading cinemas in town and was also used for revue shows. It was destroyed in the bombing of Nagoya in World War II.

References

External links 

 役割番附／名古屋末広座

1883 establishments in Japan
Buildings and structures in Japan destroyed during World War II
Former kabuki theatres
History of Nagoya
Sakae, Nagoya
Theatres in Nagoya